The Federation of Young Socialists (FGS) was the youth wing of the Italian Socialist Party.

History
The organization proclaims itself heir to the Italian Socialist Youth Federation (FGSI), a youth organization of the Italian Socialist Party initially born in Florence on 6 and 7 September 1903, re-founded after the Fascist period in 1944, by the anti-fascist militants Eugenio Colorni, Giorgio Lauchard, Matteo Matteotti, Leo Solari and Mario Zagari.

With Tangentopoli, the Italian political situation - and therefore also that of the young socialists - enters a period of great chaos. Ottaviano Del Turco, secretary of the PSI from 1993 to 1994 (the year of its dissolution), appointed the then vice president of the Iusy and head of international political campaigns of the FGSI, Luca Cefisi, to carry out the role of national coordinator in this emergency situation: many leaders, shocked, in fact abandoned political militancy, or passed, according to personal inclinations, to Forza Italia or to the Democratic Party of the Left; others instead abandoned politics.

After the dissolution of the historical Italian Socialist Party, in October 1994 the Italian Socialist Youth Federation (FGSI) was succeeded by the Federation of Young Socialists; the new youth organisation was chaired by Luca Cefisi, previously secretary of the FGSI; the nascent Federation held its first congress in 1996, electing Marco Di Lello National Secretary, and Claudio Carotti, Deputy Secretary. The Federation of Young Socialists, which remained affiliated with the International Union of Socialist Youth and the European Community Organisation of Socialist Youth, federated first with the Italian Socialists and later with the Italian Democratic Socialists. It held its inaugural congress in Grottaferrata on 18-20 October 1996. 

Later it joined the experience of the Socialist Constituent Assembly which ended on 4-6 July 2008 with the 1st Congress of the resounded Socialist Party; within which, albeit with some divergences, it officially supported the candidacy of Pia Locatelli for the secretariat of the party.

In October 2008 the National Directorate of Young Socialists decided to celebrate their congress on 31 January and 1 February 2009 in Salerno, in which Luigi Iorio was elected new National Secretary. The VI Congress of the FGS was held in Rome from 11 to 13 November 2011, with Claudia Bastianelli unanimously elected National Secretary. Bastianelli was the first woman to take over the leadership of the Socialist youth organisation. 

During the VII Congress of th FGS, held in Ravenna between 9 and 11 January 2015, Roberto Sajeva was unanimously elected new Secretary.

In 2016 the Federation hosts the YES Summer Camp, a summer meeting of all political youth members of the Young European Socialists (YES). On this occasion, the FGS also adopted a new symbol by Camillo Bosco: a sun, the "star of the future", and the Three Arrows. The latter is a historical  socialist symbol, dating back even earlier to the Iron Front, an anti-fascist paramilitary organisation in Germany which opposed Hitler and his Nazi Party.

From 19 to 21 October 2018 the VIII National Congress was held in Rome, which led to the election of Enrico Maria Pedrelli as Secretary. 

On 12 April 2019, the Federation of Young Socialists clashed with the Italian Socialist Party following the political agreement that saw the latter party, a member of the Party of European Socialists, compete in the 2019 European Parliament election in alliance with More Europe, which is affiliated with the Alliance of Liberals and Democrats for Europe Party. This stance was heavily criticised by the party, but there were many exponents who expressed their solidarity with the FGS, inside and outside the party.

Secretaries
 Luca Cefisi (1994–1996)
 Marco Di Lello (1996–1999)
 Claudio Accogli (1999–2003)
 Gianluca Quadrana (2003–2006)
 Francesco Mosca (2006–2008)
 Luigi Iorio (2009–2011)
 Claudia Bastianelli (2011–2015)
 Roberto Sajeva (2015–2018)
 Enrico Maria Pedrelli (2018–present)

References

External links
 Official Website

1994 establishments in Italy
Youth wings of political parties in Italy
Youth wings of social democratic parties